An initial list of 35 players ("provisional list") for each participating nation was published by CONCACAF on 10 June 2015. A "final list" containing 23 players for each participating nation was published by CONCACAF on 23 June 2015.

Three of the players named in the final list had to be goalkeepers. The players named in the final list had to have shirts numbered 1 to 23; number 1 was reserved for a goalkeeper.

Teams that qualified for the knockout stage could replace up to six players. The replacements had to have been named on the provisional list and were given a shirt numbered between 24 and 29.

Group A

Haiti
Head coach:  Marc Collat

Final List

Alternate players on Provisional List

Notes

Honduras
Head coach:  Jorge Luis Pinto

Final List

Alternate players on Provisional List

Notes

Panama
Head coach:  Hernán Darío Gómez

Final List

Alternate players on Provisional List

United States
Head coach:  Jürgen Klinsmann

Final List

Alternate players on Provisional List

Notes

Group B

Canada
Head coach:  Benito Floro

Final List

Alternate players on Provisional List

Costa Rica
Head coach:  Paulo Wanchope

Final List

Alternate players on Provisional List

Notes

El Salvador
Head coach:  Albert Roca

Final List

Alternate players on Provisional List

Jamaica
Head coach:  Winfried Schäfer

Final List

Alternate players on Provisional List

Notes

Group C

Cuba
Head coach:  Raúl González Triana

Final List

Alternate players on Provisional List

Notes

Guatemala
Head coach:  Iván Sopegno

Final List

Alternate players on Provisional List

Mexico
Head coach:  Miguel Herrera

Final List

Alternate players on Provisional List

Notes

Trinidad and Tobago
Head coach:  Stephen Hart

Final List

Alternate players on Provisional List

Player representation

By club

By club nationality
Nations in bold are represented by their national teams in the tournament.

The above table is the same when it comes to league representation, with only the following exceptions:
The American league had 61 representatives with the inclusion of players coming from Canada-based FC Edmonton, Montreal Impact, Ottawa Fury FC, Toronto FC and Vancouver Whitecaps FC.
The English league had 22 representatives with the inclusion of one player coming from Wales-based Cardiff City.

References

CONCACAF Gold Cup squads
2015 CONCACAF Gold Cup